Chamloei Rak is a 1960 novel by Chuwong Chayachinda which has been adapted for two movies and five television series.

Plot
The story of Soorya whose life changed when she was kidnapped by Harit Rangsiman, a landowner who mistakes her for her cousin who caused his brother's death. Humiliated and forced to work, Soorya strikes up a friendship with a deaf and dumb man who was also a victim of Harit's cruelty. Harit realised his mistake and releases Soorya, but only to allow him to spy on her cousin, which leads to her downfall.

Film, TV or theatrical adaptations 

Chamloei Rak has been adapted for two movies and five television series.

 1963 Film - Starring Mitr Chaibancha as Harit and Pisamai Wilaisak as Soorya
 1974 TV series - Starring Sa-ard Piampongsarn as Harit 
 1978 Film - Starring Piroj Sangwoributh as Harit and Nawarath Yuktanan as Soorya
 1980 TV series - Starring Witoon Karuna as Harit and Panadda Komaratat as Soorya
 1988 TV series - Starring Likhit Akemongkol as Harit and Sawitree Sameepuk Soorya
 1997-98 TV series - Starring John Rattanaveroj as Harit and Kulsatree Siripongpreeda as Soorya
 2008 TV series - Starring Atichart Chumnanont as Harit and Taksaorn Paksukcharern as Soorya

External links 
'Queen of Thai Romance' bids farewell
Jam Loey Rak ( Defendant of Love )

Thai novels
Thai television soap operas
1970s Thai television series
1980s Thai television series
1990s Thai television series
2000s Thai television series